David Roockley is a former professional rugby league footballer who played in the 1980s.

Playing career

County honours
David Roockley won a cap playing  for Yorkshire while at Castleford in the 24-14 victory over Lancashire at Leeds' stadium on 21 September 1988.

Challenge Cup Final appearances
David Roockley played as an interchange/substitute (replacing  Gary Lord) in Castleford's 15-14 victory over Hull Kingston Rovers in the 1986 Challenge Cup Final during the 1985–86 season at Wembley Stadium, London on Saturday 3 May 1986, in front of a crowd of 82,134.

County Cup Final appearances
David Roockley played  in Castleford's 12-12 draw with Bradford Northern in the 1987 Yorkshire County Cup Final during the 1987–88 season at Headingley Rugby Stadium, Leeds on Saturday 17 October 1987, played  in the 2-11 defeat by Bradford Northern in the 1987 Yorkshire County Cup Final replay during the 1987–88 season at Elland Road, Leeds on Saturday 31 October 1987, and played as an interchange/substitute, i.e. number 15, (replacing  Chris Chapman) in the 12-33 defeat by Leeds in the 1988 Yorkshire County Cup Final during the 1988–89 season at Elland Road, Leeds on Sunday 16 October 1988.

References

External links
Statistics at rugbyleagueproject.org
David Roockley Memory Box Search at archive.castigersheritage.com

Living people
Castleford Tigers players
English rugby league players
Place of birth missing (living people)
Rugby league fullbacks
Year of birth missing (living people)
Yorkshire rugby league team players